Heywood Central F.C. was a short-lived association football club from the town of Heywood in Lancashire.

History

The club was formed in 1887 and immediately entered the FA Cup,   as well as the Lancashire Junior Cup.   The FA Cup entry was far too soon for a new club, and, when arriving at first round opponents Higher Walton, the club decided to scratch, and play the fixture as a friendly instead, which Higher Walton won 8-1.

The junior cup competition was more the club's level, and there was obvious support for the club, as over 4,000 made it to the Phoenix ground for the third round victory over Bury. The club lost in the semi-final to Blackpool 2-0; the match was played at Preston North End's Deepdale ground and Blackpool brought around 1,500 fans, Central around 600.

FA Cup

After its abortive first FA Cup entry, the club entered again in 1888-89, but lost in the first qualifying round to Astley Bridge.  In 1890-91, the club gained both its first win in the competition, 4-1 at Witton, and its biggest win in the competition, 9-0 against Gorton Villa in the second qualifying round.  The club however never made it to the first round proper, falling at the final hurdle in 1890-91, to Halliwell.  Central protested on the grounds that one of the umpires had been a member of the Halliwell club, but Halliwell proved that the umpire had only been a member of the Halliwell Cricket Club, which had no links with the football club, and the Lancashire Football Association dismissed the appeal.

Lancashire League

In 1888-89, the club was a founder member of the Lancashire League.  The club was initially successful, finishing third in its first two seasons.  The club was also a regular entrant of the Lancashire Senior Cup but never got past the first round.

The increase in professionalism, the augmentation of the Football League, and the marginalization of the Lancashire League all contributed to a financial crisis for the club.  In December 1893 the club was forced to release "three of their most expensive men".  The result was the club dropped from mid-table in the Lancashire League in 1892-93 to bottom but one in 1893-94 and bottom in 1894-95.  The club therefore resigned from the league at the end of the season.  

The liquidation of the club was announced in January 1896.  The club had debts of £550, and offered creditors a dividend of 1s 6d in the £, or a 7.5% return.

In 1900, the Hooley Bridge club changed its name to Heywood Central, but it had no link with the original club.

Colours

The club's colours were red and white "quarters", which, in modern vocabulary, refers to halves.

Notable players

Tommy Crawshaw, future England international, left the club in 1894

Jimmy Crabtree, future England international, played for the club in 1891-92

References

Defunct football clubs in Lancashire
Association football clubs established in the 19th century